The 1980 World Tour was a concert tour by English musician and composer Elton John, in support of his 14th studio album 21 at 33. the tour included two legs (North America and Oceania) and a total of 63 shows.

Tour

John's 1980 tour was unique for two reasons: it was the only tour he has ever done that had a guitarist in the band, but did not include Davey Johnstone, and it is the only time a band member (in this case drummer Nigel Olsson) has done songs from his solo career in the middle of a show. Olsson, who had rejoined John's band along with Dee Murray after six years, performed his own releases, "Saturday Night" and "All I Want Is You". And while Johnstone did make a guest appearance at one show (joining in on "Bite Your Lip (Get Up and Dance") at 6 November stop at The Forum in Los Angeles), he primarily was involved with Alice Cooper's career and had been replaced in John's band by two premiere session guitarists: Tim Renwick from England and American Richie Zito.

The new band did a private warm-up gig at the Palomino Club in Los Angeles on 25 August, exactly ten years to the day from his first American show at the nearby Troubadour. Then, with opening act Judie Tzuke, the tour moved across North America before landing with great fanfare at New York City's Central Park. There, on 13 September, John and the band played a free concert in front of an estimated 450,000 people. The show was highlighted by a cover of John Lennon's "Imagine" in the shadow of Lennon's apartment, and John's choice of costumes, including the "piano keys" outfit designed by Andre Miripolsky; he dressed as Donald Duck for the encores, in a costume designed by Bob Mackie. The Central Park show was recorded and broadcast as a concert special on HBO, and later released on home video. Clips from the show have been posted on Elton John's official website; however, to date no audio of the soundtrack has ever been officially released. 

After the last United States show on 15 November in Honolulu, Hawaii, the tour concluded with 17 concerts in New Zealand and Australia, finishing at the Perth Entertainment Centre (as he had on the 1979 tour) on 22 December.

Tour dates

Set list

"Funeral for a Friend/Love Lies Bleeding"
"Tiny Dancer"
"Goodbye Yellow Brick Road"
"All the Girls Love Alice"
"Rocket Man"
"Sartorial Eloquence"
"Philadelphia Freedom"
"Sorry Seems to Be the Hardest Word"
"Saturday Night" (Nigel Olsson song)
"All I Want Is You" (Nigel Olsson song)
"Saturday Night's Alright for Fighting"
"Harmony"
"White Lady, White Powder"
"Little Jeannie"
"Bennie and the Jets"
"Imagine" (John Lennon song)
"Ego"
"Have Mercy on the Criminal"
"Someone Saved My Life Tonight"
"Your Song"
"Bite Your Lip"

Tour band
Elton John – lead vocals, piano
Richie Zito – lead guitar, backing vocals
Tim Renwick – rhythm guitar, backing vocals
Dee Murray – bass guitar, backing vocals
Nigel Olsson – drums, backing vocals
James Newton Howard – keyboards, synthesizer, electric piano, backing vocals

References

External links

 Information Site with Tour Dates

Elton John concert tours
1980 concert tours